QEII Stadium may refer to:
Queen Elizabeth II Park
Queensland Sport and Athletics Centre